Sagiv Cohen (born 20 February 1975) is an Israeli singer, mostly famous as a singer of Mizraḥi (Middle Eastern Jewish) music.

He performed and recorded several times together with Daklon.

External links
 Official YouTube channel
 Sagiv Cohen with another single “Hallelu”

1975 births
Living people
21st-century Israeli male singers
People from Pardes Hanna-Karkur